Charente-Maritime (Poitevin-Saintongeais: Chérente-Marine) is a department in the Nouvelle-Aquitaine region on the southwestern coast of France. Named after the river Charente, its prefecture is La Rochelle. As of 2019, it had a population of 651,358 with an area of 6,864 square kilometres (2,650 sq mi).

History

Previously a part of the provinces of Saintonge and Aunis, Charente-Inférieure was one of the 83 original departments created during the French Revolution on 4 March 1790. On 4 September 1941, during World War II, it was renamed as Charente-Maritime.

When the department was first organised, the commune of Saintes was designated as the prefecture of the department (Saintes had previously been the capital of Saintonge). This changed in 1810 when Napoleon passed an imperial decree to move the prefecture to La Rochelle.

During World War II, the department was invaded by the German Army and became part of occupied France. To provide defence against a possible beach landing by the Allies, the Organisation Todt constructed a number of sea defences in the area. Defences such as pillboxes are particularly noticeable on the beaches of the presqu'île d'Arvert and the island of Oléron.

At the end of the war, the two last pockets of German resistance were both in this area: at La Rochelle in the north and Royan in the south. Despite Royan having been nearly destroyed during an RAF bombing raid on 5 January 1945, the town was not liberated by the French Forces of the Interior until April of the same year. La Rochelle was finally liberated on 9 May 1945.

Geography

Charente-Maritime is part of the Nouvelle-Aquitaine administrative region. It is surrounded by the departments of Gironde, Charente, Deux-Sèvres, Dordogne and Vendée. It has a land area of 6864 km2 and 651,358 inhabitants as of 2019.

The important rivers are the Charente and its tributaries, the Boutonne and the Seugne, along with the Sèvre Niortaise, the Seudre and the Garonne, in its downstream part, which is the estuary of the Gironde.

The department includes the islands of Île de Ré, Île d'Aix, Ile d'Oléron and Île Madame.

The department forms the northern part of the Aquitaine Basin. It is separated from the Massif Armoricain by the Marais Poitevin to the north-west and from the Parisian basin by the Seuil du Poitou to the north-east. The highest point in the department is in the woods of Chantemerlière, near the commune of Contré in the north-east, and rises to 173 m.

Principal towns

The most populous commune is La Rochelle, the prefecture. As of 2019, there are 7 communes with more than 8,000 inhabitants:

Climate
The climate is mild and sunny, with less than 900 mm of precipitation per year and with insolation being remarkably high, in fact, the highest in Western France including southernmost sea resorts such as Biarritz.

Economy
The economy of Charente-Maritime is based on three major sectors: tourism, maritime industry, and manufacturing. Cognac and pineau are two of the major agricultural products with maize and sunflowers being the others.

During the summer months, families flock from all over Europe to bask in the sun and enjoy the local seafood. Royan, popular for its extensive beaches and attractions, is one of the most famous seaside resort of atlantic coast.

Charente-Maritime is the headquarters of the major oyster producer Marennes-Oléron. Oysters cultivated here are shipped across Europe.

Rochefort is a shipbuilding site and has been a major French naval base since 1665.

La Rochelle is a seat of major French industry. Just outside the city, in Aytré, is a factory for the French engineering giant Alstom, where the TGV, the cars for the Paris and other metros are manufactured (see :fr:Alstom Aytré). It is a popular venue for tourism, with its picturesque medieval harbour and city walls.

Demographics
The inhabitants of the department are called Charentais-Maritimes.

Politics

Departmental Council of Charente-Maritime

The President of the Departmental Council has been Dominique Bussereau (LR) since 2008. He was replaced by Sylvie Marcilly after the departmental elections of June 2021.

National representation
In the 2017 legislative election, Charente-Maritime elected the following members of the National Assembly:

In the Senate, Charente-Maritime is represented by three members: Daniel Laurent (since 2008), Corinne Imbert (since 2014) and Mickaël Vallet (since 2020).

Tourism
Popular destinations include La Rochelle, Royan, Saintes, Saint-Jean-d'Angély, Rochefort, the Île d'Aix, Île de Ré and Île d'Oléron.

The department is served by the TGV at Surgères and La Rochelle. It can also be reached by motorway by the A10 (E5, Paris-Bordeaux) and A837 (E602, Saintes-Rochefort).

See also
Cantons of the Charente-Maritime department
Communes of the Charente-Maritime department
Arrondissements of the Charente-Maritime department
Éclade des Moules

References

External links 
  
  Prefecture website
  Departmental Council website
  Tourism website

 
1790 establishments in France
Nouvelle-Aquitaine region articles needing translation from French Wikipedia
Departments of Nouvelle-Aquitaine
States and territories established in 1790